Rosalina Tuyuc Velásquez (born San Juan Comalapa, department of Chimaltenango, 1956)
is a Guatemalan human rights activist. She was elected as a Congressional deputy in 1995, elected from the national list of the New Guatemala Democratic Front, and served as Vice President of Congress during that period.
Tuyuc is a Kaqchikel Mayan.

In June 1982, the Guatemalan Army kidnapped and murdered her father, Francisco Tuyuc. Three years later, on 24 May 1985, her husband suffered the same fate. In 1988, she founded the National Association of Guatemalan Widows (CONAVIGUA), which has become a leading Guatemalan human rights organization.

In 1994, Tuyuc was decorated by the French Ordre national de la Légion d'honneur for her humanitarian activities. 
On 6 July 2004 President Óscar Berger appointed her to chair the National Reparations Commission (Comisión Nacional de Resarcimiento). In 2011, she publicly criticized the Commission for its failure to adequately address the damage caused by the war.

The Niwano Peace Foundation of Japan awarded their 2012 Niwano Peace Prize to Tuyuc "in recognition of her extraordinary and dogged work for peace as a courageous human rights activist and leader."

See also
 Guatemalan Civil War

References

External links
 Biographical information from PeaceWomen Across the Globe.

Living people
People from Chimaltenango Department
Guatemalan women activists
Guatemalan human rights activists
Women human rights activists
Guatemalan Maya people
Members of the Congress of Guatemala
Indigenous activists of the Americas
Recipients of the Legion of Honour
Nonviolence advocates
1956 births
20th-century Guatemalan women politicians
20th-century Guatemalan politicians
Kaqchikel